This article is one of a series providing information about endemism among birds in the world's various zoogeographic zones. For an overview of this subject see Endemism in birds.

Patterns of endemism
Japan has no endemic families. It has one endemic genus: Apalopteron, which contains the Bonin white-eye. The extinct Bonin grosbeak was formerly considered the only member of the genus Chaunoproctus, but taxonomic analysis supports it as being a basal member of the rosefinch genus Carpodacus.

Endemic Bird Areas
Birdlife International has defined the following Endemic Bird Areas (EBAs) in Japan:

 Izu Islands
 Ogasawara Islands
 Nansei Shoto

The following have been designated as secondary areas:

 Central Honshu lowland forests
 Central Honshu montane forests
 Iwo Islands
 Other islands

List of species
The following is a list of bird species endemic to Japan:

Resident endemics

Breeding endemics

References 

Japan
Japan
'